WOW Café Theater is a feminist theater space and collective in East Village in New York City. In the mid-1980s, WOW Cafe Theater was central to the avant garde theatre and performance art scene in the East Village, New York City. Among the artists who have presented at the space are Peggy Shaw, Lois Weaver, Patricia Ione LLoyd, Lisa Kron, Holly Hughes, Deb Margolin, Dancenoise, Carmelita Tropicana, Eileen Myles, Split Britches, Seren Divine, and The Five Lesbian Brothers.

The WOW Cafe is still running today, and meets almost every Tuesday.

Organizing structure 
WOW Cafe Theater is run on anarchical principals of consensus building. Currently WOW does not charge membership fees and members participate in sweat equity, in order to get produce a show, they are expected to help with others' shows as well.  Despite the historical focus of WOW productions on lesbian experiences and subcultures, WOW remains an open space for all women and/or trans people, particularly women of color and queer women.  Most decisions are made at the collective meetings held every Tuesday at 6:30 pm in WOW space on East 4th Street. In March 2020, during COVID-19 pandemic the meetings have moved online.

History

1980s 
The WOW Cafe Theater began when two of the founding members, Lois Weaver and Peggy Shaw were traveling Europe with performance troupes Spiderwoman Theater and Hot Peaches, and after seeing women's theater festivals during their tour were inspired to establish one in America. Shaw and Weaver, also founding members of the Split Britches theater troupe, described their style, making lesbianism and feminism not issues, but givens: "We didn't make it that clear-- switching roles. We didn't even basically mention it," Shaw said of their time teaching at Hampshire. Together with Jordi Mark and Pamela Camhe, veterans of feminist- and street-theater performing, they established the Women's One World Festival in 1980, setting up in the Allcraft Center in the East Village and using what they had seen at the women's theater festivals in Europe for structural inspiration. The organizing women wanted the festival to have what Weaver described as a "multimedia environment," and so in addition to performances, the WOW Festival incorporated things like the social cafe atmosphere, film showings, and dancing. Many of the performers came in troupes from Europe, and, because the WOW festival was self-funded and on a very tight budget, they covered their own costs of living and arranged their own housing, often being taken in by festival supporters; the opportunity to perform in a festival in New York and the chance for exposure was motivation enough to participate in the festival. The success of the festival prompted management from the Allcraft Center to allow the women to stay in the performance space and continue to produce women's performance art, after which the women began hosting performance nights on a weekly basis.

Eventually, the women of WOW had to leave the Allcraft Center due to pressure from the board that funded the center, believed to be at least partially motivated by homophobic sentiments towards the group's largely lesbian makeup, and had to find a new space in which to perform, ending up at the Ukrainian National Home and adapting a ballroom to their uses. After hosting a second festival at the Ukrainian National Home and not wanting to dissolve their creative collective, the members of the WOW Festival began plans to establish a permanent performance space/café for the group. Using money they raised through parties, special performances, and other benefits, WOW settled on a space at 330 E 11th Street.

At first, WOW primarily used the venue as an actual cafe rather than a performance space, selling sandwiches and coffee and serving more of a social purpose than an artistic one while they were getting settled. Before long, however, the WOW women built a small stage in the cafe and began to once again hold performances for women artists.

Early works in the space included Holly Hughes's Well of Horniness; Split Britches's Split Britches and Beauty and the Beast; and Tennessee Waltz, a show depicting the women of Tennessee Williams plays, devised by early collaborators in WOW. In addition to theatre, the space was home to brunches, art shows, Variety Night, Cabaret BOW WOW, and Talking Slide Shows (where artists would present slides of their work and discuss it).

In 1983 Susan Young became the booking manager for the WOW Cafe and it became more organized as a performance space instead of being managed entirely as a collective. Young's influence transformed the Cafe into a more formal space as well, allowing outside groups to organize and manage some of the events that took place there, rather than leaving all production responsibilities up to the Café for every performance.

In 1984, WOW moved to its current location on E. 4th St.

Funding 
Finding funding for the WOW Cafe was always difficult. While most bills could be covered by the box office sales, at times the rent and utilities were paid via benefits, parties, paid dances, or begging passersby. The collective's philosophy was "It's easier to get a job than a grant," and many of the founding members contributed their outside salaries to the project. The founders of WOW refused to apply for large grants, preferring grassroots fundraising, donating their own money, and getting small grants here and there. They rejected the notion of changing their work to receive or maintain grants, insisting WOW was a place for complete freedom of expression for the outsiders of society. WOW collective members were aware of the money and publicity received by gay men's theaters, noting that The New York Times had never attended a show and The Village Voice rarely ever came, while both regularly reviewed and praised gay men's theaters.

Performance atmosphere and lesbian focus 
To maintain the feeling of collective effort and openness, the WOW organizers declined to hold auditions for their performers, believing that requiring an audition to qualify for their performance space would lead to censorship, which they felt they had experienced after being locked out of the Allcraft Center. It was important for the WOW Cafe to maintain its integrity as an uncensored, collective space since the space itself, the performers, performances, and even audience members were all very geared towards lesbian lives and narratives. Because of this emphasis on the life experiences of lesbians, a lot of the subject matter of the performances had to do with gender roles and norms, often recreating them to highlight and challenge them as social constructs. Some of the criticism that the WOW Cafe received actually targeted their usage of the butch/femme binary in their performances, considering it to be problematic and regressive, but the Cafe maintained its stance that the portrayal and incorporation of these stereotypes served as social commentary. Very often, the performers used comedy to facilitate the realization of these stereotypes and caricatures, exaggerating the gendered aspects of the characters they portrayed to highlight them.

2000s 
During the early 2000s as a result of an increased gentrification and commercialization of East Village many spaces were being threatened. In 2005 WOW Cafe Theater changed its mission to explicitly include all women and/or trans people. In early 2000s through series of meetings with NY City officials WOW has been the space it is in. Currently WOW is a member of ARC which comprises several organizations in 59-61 East 4th building. WOW is a founding member of FAB, an organization created in 2001 by a coalition of cultural and community nonprofits on East 4th Street to save their homes. Since 2005, WOW has made it a priority to explicitly welcome people of intersecting identities of all ages, races, religions, ethnicities, sexualities, and gender identities.

Notable productions  
Well of Horniness (written by Holly Hughes (1985))
Split Britches (written and directed by Peggy Shaw, Lois Weaver, and Deborah Margolin (1981))
Beauty and the Beast (written and directed by Peggy Shaw, Lois Weaver, and Deborah Margolin (1982))
Upwardly Mobile Home (written and directed by Peggy Shaw, Lois Weaver, and Deborah Margolin (1984))
Voyage to Lesbos (written by the Five Lesbian Brothers Maureen Angelos, Lisa Kron, Babs Davy, Dominique Dibbell, and Peg Healey (1990), directed by Kate Stafford (1990))
Brave Smiles (written by the Five Lesbian Brothers Maureen Angelos, Lisa Kron, Babs Davy, Dominique Dibbell, and Peg Healey (1992), directed by Kate Stafford (1992)
Little Women (written and directed by Peggy Shaw, Lois Weaver, and Deborah Margolin (1988))

References

External links
 

Cultural history of New York City
Feminism in New York City
Feminist theatre
Lesbian culture in New York (state)
Lesbian feminist mass media
East Village, Manhattan
Theatres in Manhattan